Kim is a river in the state of Gujarat, western India, whose origin is in Zarna village and Zarnavadi village the hills of Satpuda. The creek runs near the village of Ilav (which has other spellings for its name, like 'Elaw').

See also
 Forest of the Dangs
 Indian Ocean
 South Gujarat

References

Rivers of Gujarat
Rivers of India